Thayige Thakka Maga (Like Mother Like Son) is a 1978 Indian Kannada-language sports action film directed by V. Somashekhar and produced by Parvathamma Rajkumar. It is based on the story written by Anjaneya Pushpanand.

The film starred Rajkumar as a boxer along with Savitri, Padmapriya and Sowcar Janaki. Veteran Tamil-Telugu actress Savitri plays one of the title role of Thayi (Mother) in this film. The screenplay, dialogues and lyrics are written by Chi. Udaya Shankar. The movie saw a theatrical run of 25 weeks.

The film was remade in Telugu as Puli Bidda (1981) and in Hindi as Main Intequam Loonga (1982) starring Dharmendra.

Cast 
 Rajkumar as Boxer Kumar
 Padmapriya as Mala
 Savitri as Vishalakshamma
 Sowcar Janaki as Annapoorna
 Master Lohith as young Kumar
 Balakrishna as Ramanagara Kuppuswamy
 Shakti Prasad as Boxer Vishwanath
 Thoogudeepa Srinivas
 Prabhakar
 Rajanand 
 Chi. Udaya Shankar   
 Uma Shivakumar 
 Mamatha Shenoy

Soundtrack 
The music was composed by T. G. Lingappa with lyrics by Chi. Udaya Shankar.

See also 
Bangaarada Panjara
Premada Kanike
Shankar Guru
Havina Hede
Parasuram

References

External links 
 

1978 films
1970s Kannada-language films
1970s sports films
Kannada films remade in other languages
Films scored by T. G. Lingappa
Films directed by V. Somashekhar
Indian boxing films
Indian sports films
Sports action films